Ira Mellman is an American cell biologist who discovered endosomes.  He serves as Vice President of Research Oncology at Genentech in South San Francisco, California.

Research
Mellman's work has examined the role of endocytosis in cell metabolism and human disease.  He was among the first to characterize the endosomal system.  Later projects include investigation of LDL cholesterol receptor internalization, cellular sorting machinery, and the cellular basis for immunity.  He is an authority on the cell biological mechanisms and function of dendritic cells, the cell type responsible for initiating the immune response, an interest that dates back to his postdoctoral period at Rockefeller University in the lab of Ralph Steinman, who won the Nobel Prize in 2011 for his discovery of dendritic cells.

Early life and education
Mellman grew up in New York, where he lived until he enrolled at Oberlin College in Oberlin, Ohio. While in college he maintained an interest in music but focused on the rapidly expanding field of cell biology. Working with David Miller, he began to study Chlamydomonas and found that a significant amount of the cell wall consisted of extensin. After leaving Oberlin, he enrolled in the graduate program at the University of California, Berkeley, but later transferred to Yale University to switch to research more applicable to people. At Yale, he studied the genetics behind vitamin B12 metabolism under the guidance of geneticist Leon Rosenberg. He became interested in endocytosis and did a postdoc with Ralph Steinman and Zanvil A. Cohn at Rockefeller University and started characterizing endosomes.

Return to Yale and later years
He returned to Yale after completing postdoctoral work and remained there as a professor for over twenty years. During this time he was the Sterling Professor of Cell Biology & Immunobiology, chair of the Cell Biology Department, Scientific Director of the Yale Cancer Center and a member of the Ludwig Institute for Cancer Research. Mellman has served on the council of the American Society for Cell Biology, is currently on the Board of Directors of the American Association for Cancer Research, and was the editor-in-chief of the Journal of Cell Biology from 1999 to 2008. He remains active as a senior editor for the journal.

In 2007, he was recruited to Genentech as the VP of Research Oncology to replace Marc Tessier-Lavigne. There, the company is developing understanding of immunology and along that, immunotherapy.

Mellman is a member of the United States National Academy of Sciences, a Fellow of the American Academy of Arts and Sciences, and a Foreign Associate of the European Molecular Biology Organization (EMBO).

In 1976, he married Margaret Moench; the couple have three children.

Appearances
In December 2018, Mellman spoke at the 'Antibody Engineering and Therapeutics" conference, which took place in San Diego, California.

References

Living people
Yale University faculty
Jewish American scientists
Oberlin College alumni
Members of the European Molecular Biology Organization
Fellows of the American Academy of Arts and Sciences
Genentech people
Members of the United States National Academy of Sciences
Yale Sterling Professors
21st-century American biologists
Cell biologists
Year of birth missing (living people)
21st-century American Jews